Peace Orji (born 20 December 1995) is Nigerian badminton player. She participated at the 2019 African Games and won the gold medal in the mixed team event and also a bronze medal in the mixed doubles.

Achievements

African Games 
Mixed doubles

African Championships 
Women's doubles

Mixed doubles

BWF International Challenge/Series (2 titles, 2 runners-up) 
Women's doubles

Mixed doubles

  BWF International Challenge tournament
  BWF International Series tournament
  BWF Future Series tournament

References

External links 
 

1995 births
Living people
Nigerian female badminton players
Competitors at the 2019 African Games
African Games gold medalists for Nigeria
African Games bronze medalists for Nigeria
African Games medalists in badminton
21st-century Nigerian women